Momino (Cyrillic Момино) may refer to:

 Momino, Haskovo Province, village in Haskovo Province, Bulgaria
 Momino, Targovishte Province, village in Targovishte Province, Bulgaria
 Momino Selo, Plovdiv province, see List of Turkish exonyms in Bulgaria
 Momino Point, Antarctica

See also
 Momina (disambiguation)